The term supreme (also spelled suprême) used in cooking and culinary arts refers to the best part of the food. For poultry, game and fish dishes, supreme denotes a fillet.

Chicken
In professional cookery, the term "chicken supreme" is used to describe a boneless, skin-on breast of chicken. If the humerus bone of the wing remains attached, the cut is called "chicken cutlet". The same cut is used for duck, and other birds.

Chicken supremes can be prepared in many ways. For example, supremes à la Maréchale are treated à l'anglaise ("English-style"), i.e. coated with eggs and breadcrumbs, and sautéed. A supreme can be minced resulting in such dishes as suprême de volaille Pojarski. There are also various versions with stuffing. A popular variety is suprême de volaille à la Kiev, commonly known as chicken Kiev, for which chicken supremes are stuffed with butter.

Fruit

To supreme a citrus fruit is to remove the skin, pith, membranes, and seeds, and to separate its segments. Used as a noun, a supreme can be a wedge of citrus fruit prepared in this way.

Sauce
Suprême sauce (sauce suprême) is a rich white sauce made of chicken stock and cream. This sauce is often served with chicken dishes.

The term "supreme" is also used for a dish dressed with a suprême sauce (e.g. a suprême of barracuda).

Other cooking uses
Supreme can also be used as a term in cookery in the following ways:
 A tall sorbet glass
 A dessert served in a supreme

See also

 List of cooking techniques

References

Cooking techniques
Culinary terminology